Elizabeth Marie Allen is an American political advisor who serves as acting under secretary of state for public diplomacy and public affairs. On January 23, 2023, President Biden announced his intent to nominate Allen for the permanent role of under secretary. 

Allen previously served as assistant secretary of state for global public affairs and as White House deputy communications director during the Obama administration.

Early life and education 
Allen is a native of Buffalo, New York. She graduated from Williamsville South High School in Williamsville, New York in 2002. She earned a bachelor of arts degree in political science and sociology from the State University of New York at Geneseo, where she graduated magna cum laude and phi beta kappa.

Career 
As an undergraduate, Allen served as an intern at the United States Department of State, where she specialized in human trafficking and international women's issues.
 
After graduating from college, Allen served as the associate director of operations for the 2008 Democratic National Convention. She later joined Barack Obama's 2008 presidential campaign and worked on the 2009 Inauguration. From 2009 until 2013, Allen was a member of the communications team for Vice President Joseph Biden, and was promoted to serve as deputy director of communications. From 2014 to 2015, she served as the director of public affairs and strategic communication for the Bureau of Educational and Cultural Affairs.

From 2015 to 2017, Allen served as the White House deputy communications director. While working for Obama, she planned several "first time" presidential events, such as Obama's visit to the Arctic Circle and his meeting with federal inmates in Oklahoma.

After the end of the Obama administration, Allen joined The Glover Park Group, a communications consulting firm (now called Finsbury Glover Hering), as senior vice president, .

In August 2020, Allen took a leave of absence from Glover Park Group to serve as communications director to Kamala Harris after she was announced as Joe Biden's running mate in the 2020 United States presidential election.

Allen left as a partner at Finsbury Glover Hering (FGH) when President Biden appointed her as assistant secretary of state for global public affairs on August 25, 2021. She was sworn in on September 13, 2021. Allen has been a central figure in U.S. government's efforts to both combat disinformation surrounding the 2022 Russian invasion of Ukraine and increase support for the Ukrainian people and their government in their war with the Russians.

On April 4, 2022, secretary of state Antony Blinken delegated to her the functions and authorities of the under secretary of state for public diplomacy and public affairs.

References

External links 

 Official biography, U.S. Department of State

Biden administration personnel
Living people
Obama administration personnel
People from Buffalo, New York
People from Williamsville, New York
State University of New York at Geneseo alumni
United States Assistant Secretaries of State
Year of birth missing (living people)